In linguistics, a denti-alveolar consonant or dento-alveolar consonant is a consonant that is articulated with a flat tongue against the alveolar ridge and the upper teeth, such as  and  in languages such as French, Italian and Spanish. That is, a denti-alveolar consonant is (pre)alveolar and laminal rather than purely dental. 

Although denti-alveolar consonants are often labeled as "dental" because only the forward contact with the teeth is visible, the point of contact of the tongue that is farthest back is most relevant, as it defines the maximum acoustic space of resonance and gives a characteristic sound to a consonant.

In French, the contact that is the farthest back is alveolar or sometimes slightly pre-alveolar.

The dental clicks are also laminal denti-alveolar.

References

Sources

Place of articulation
Dental consonants
Alveolar consonants